The structure of the Australian Army during World War I included a small force of mostly militia which served in Australia and larger expeditionary forces which were raised for deployment overseas following the outbreak of the conflict in August 1914. The home army consisted of the small regular Permanent Forces, the part-time Citizen Forces, and the Australian Garrison Artillery, which were maintained in Australia to defend the country from attack, while expeditionary forces consisted of the Australian Naval and Military Expeditionary Force (AN&MEF) which occupied German New Guinea from September 1914, and the Australian Imperial Force (AIF) which fought at Gallipoli in 1915, and in the Middle East and on the Western Front in Europe from 1916 to 1918. Following an initial precautionary mobilisation following the outbreak of war, by the end of August 1914 those units of the reserve formations of the home army that had been activated began to stand down. From 1915, only skeleton garrisons were maintained at coastal forts. Meanwhile, as the war continued overseas the AIF sustained heavy losses, and although it expanded considerably during the war, with the voluntary recruitment system unable to replace its casualties by 1918 most of its units were significantly undermanned.

Order of battle

1914

1918

See also
World War I defences of Australia
Australian Army during World War I
Structure of the Australian Army during World War II

Notes
Footnotes

Citations

References

Further reading

 
 
 
 
 

Military history of Australia during World War I
World War I orders of battle
Australian Army